The Mayan skink (Marisora lineola) is a species of skink found in Guatemala, Mexico, and Belize.

References

Marisora
Reptiles described in 2020
Taxa named by Stephen Blair Hedges